The yellow-throated greenbul (Arizelocichla chlorigula) is a species of the bulbul family of passerine birds. It is an African species found in east-central and southern Tanzania.

Taxonomy and systematics
The yellow-throated greenbul was originally described in the genus Xenocichla (a synonym for Bleda) and then classified in Andropadus. It was re-classified to the new genus Arizelocichla in 2010. Alternatively, some authorities classify the yellow-throated greenbul in the genus Pycnonotus. Some authorities have considered the yellow-throated greenbul to be a subspecies of the mountain greenbul. Alternate names for the yellow-throated greenbul include the green-throated greenbul, southern mountain greenbul and yellow-throated mountain greenbul. The name 'yellow-throated greenbul' is also used as an alternate name for the yellow-throated leaflove and Falkenstein's greenbul, while the alternate name 'green-throated greenbul' is also used by the olive-headed greenbul. Some authorities consider the yellow-throated greenbul to be synonymous with the yellow-throated leaflove.

Footnotes

References
 Baillie, J.E.M.; Hilton-Taylor, C. & Stuart, S.N. (eds.) (2004): 2004 IUCN Red List of Threatened Species. A Global Species Assessment. IUCN, Gland, Switzerland and Cambridge, UK. 
 

yellow-throated greenbul
Birds of East Africa
yellow-throated greenbul
Taxonomy articles created by Polbot